Laura Griffin is a New York Times and USA Today bestselling American author of romantic suspense. She has won Romance Writers of America RITA Award for Best Romantic Suspense twice, as well as the Daphne du Maurier Award.

Biography
Griffin started her career as a journalist and preferred hard-news stories. She attributes her experience to her desire to write suspense fiction, since she's able to make justice prevail and give the characters happy endings. "As a reporter, you cover a lot of stories that go unresolved or do not end happily."

She grew up reading Nancy Drew books, and as she grew older, Stephen King and Patricia Cornwell. "I love King and Cornwell because their books go above and beyond scary. To me it's the characters that make them so compelling — I care about the people, so I can't stop turning the pages to see what happens to them."

In 2013, Griffin teamed up with bestselling author Allison Brennan to co-write a female detective series. Since they were both with different publishers, they decided to self-publish this series.

She currently resides in Austin, Texas.

Bibliography

Alpha Crew series 

 At the Edge. March 2016
 Edge of Surrender. March 2016
 Cover of Night. September 2017
 Total Control. September 2019

Borderline

1. One Last Breath. September 2007
2. One Wrong Step. April 2008

Glass Sisters

1. Thread of Fear. October 2008
2. Whisper of Warning. April 2009

Tracers

1. Untraceable. November 2009
2. Unspeakable. July 2010
2.5 "Unstoppable". October 2010
3. Unforgivable. December 2010
4. Snapped. September 2011
5. Twisted. April 2012
6. Scorched. November 2012
7. Exposed. June 2013
8. Beyond Limits. February 2015
9. Shadow Fall. September 2015
10. Deep Dark. May 2016
11. At Close Range. January 2017
12. Touch of Red. October 2017
13. Stone Cold Heart. April 2019

Moreno & Hart Mysteries 
co-author Allison Brennan

 1. Crash and Burn. September 2013
 2. Hit and Run. July 2014
 3. Lost and Found. January 2016

Texas Murder Files series 

 1. Hidden. August 2020
 2. Flight. March 2021
 3. Midnight Dunes. May 2022

Wolfe Security series 

 1. Desperate Girls. August 2018
 2. Her Deadly Secrets. July 2019

Stand-alone works
 Far Gone. April 2014
 Nightfall. April 2013
 Surrender at Dawn. June 2011
 Last Seen Alone. September 2021

Awards and reception

 2010: Romance Writers of America RITA Award for Best Romantic Suspense for Whisper of Warning
 2013: Romance Writers of America RITA Award Finalist for Best Romantic Suspense for Twisted
 2013: Romance Writers of America RITA Award for Best Romantic Suspense for Scorched

Griffin has also received several starred reviews from Publishers Weekly, as well as a Romantic Times Top Pick.

Several of her novels made the New York Times and USA Today bestseller lists. Twisted reached the USA Today list at #132 in April 2012; Scorched reached #89 in November 2012; Exposed reached #139 in July 2013; and Beyond Limits reached #85 in February 2015.

References

External links 
 Author's Website

Living people
American romantic fiction writers
RITA Award winners
21st-century American novelists
American women novelists
Women romantic fiction writers
21st-century American women writers
1973 births